Northwest University may refer to:

Northwest University (China) in Xi'an, Shaanxi, China
Northwest University (United States) in Kirkland, Washington, US
North-West University in Potchefstroom and Mahikeng, North West Province, South Africa
Northwest University, Kano, Nigeria

See also
Northwestern University (disambiguation)
Northwestern College (disambiguation)
Indiana University Northwest in Gary, Indiana, USA
Northwest Christian University in Eugene, Oregon, USA
Northwest Missouri State University in Maryville, Missouri, USA
Northwest Nazarene University in Nampa, Idaho, USA
Pacific Northwest University of Health Sciences in Yakima, Washington, USA
Northwest Normal University in Lanzhou, Gansu, China
Northwest Minzu University in Lanzhou, Gansu, China
Northwest University of Politics and Law in Xi'an, Shaanxi, China
North West Agriculture and Forestry University in Yangling, Shaanxi, China